This is a list of electrical generating stations in Alberta, Canada.

Alberta produces a large share of its electricity through natural gas and a decreasing share of its electricity through coal (the latter to be phased out by 2023, seven years ahead of the provincial and federal phase-out). Over the last few years, a booming economy and the deregulation of the electricity market has led to the construction of dozens of new facilities—primarily alternatives (cogeneration, waste heat recovery) and renewables (e.g. wind, solar, biomass, biogas)—and the retirement of over a dozen coal-fired and older gas-fired units.

Fossil fuel

Coal
List of all coal power plants in Alberta.

Natural gas
List of all natural gas power plants in Alberta including cogeneration.

Renewable

Biomass, biogas, and waste heat recovery
List of all biomass, biogas and waste heat recovery power plants in Alberta.

Geothermal 
List of all geothermal power stations in Alberta. More than 388,500 MW of geothermal generation potential remains untapped, which is approximately 24 times Alberta's total installed generating capacity in 2019.

Hydroelectric
List of all hydroelectric power stations power plants in Alberta. More than 11,500 MW of hydroelectric potential remains untapped.

Wind
List of all wind farms power stations in Alberta.

Solar
List of all solar power stations in Alberta.

Storage

Battery
List of all lithium-ion battery storage plants in Alberta.

Pumped hydroelectric
List of all pumped hydroelectric storage plants in Alberta.

Geomechanical pumped 
List of all geomechanical pumped storage plants in Alberta.

See also

ATCO
EPCOR
TransAlta
TransCanada
Energy in Canada
List of power stations in Canada

Notes

References

Lists of power stations in Canada